The 2018 Asian Fencing Championships were held in Bangkok, Thailand from 17 to 22 June 2018 at the Rangsit Campus.

Medal summary

Men

Women

Medal table

Results

Men

Individual épée

Team épée

Individual foil

Team foil

Individual sabre

Team sabre

Women

Individual épée

Team épée

Individual foil

Team foil

Individual sabre

Team sabre

References

External links 
Results
Results at Fencing Confederation of Asia

Asian Fencing Championships
Asian Fencing Championships
International sports competitions hosted by Thailand
Asian Fencing Championships
Sport in Bangkok
Asian Fencing Championships
Fencing in Thailand